The Agreement on Agriculture (AoA) is an international treaty of the World Trade Organization. It was negotiated during the Uruguay Round of the General Agreement on Tariffs and Trade, and entered into force with the establishment of the WTO on January 1, 1995.

History

Origins
The idea of replacing agricultural price support with direct payments to farmers decoupled from production dates back to the late 1950s, when the twelfth session of the GATT Contracting Parties selected a Panel of Experts chaired by Gottfried Haberler to examine the effect of agricultural protectionism, fluctuating commodity prices and the failure of export earnings to keep pace with import demand in developing countries.

The 1958 Haberler Report stressed the importance of minimising the effect of agriculture subsidies on competitiveness and recommended replacing price support with direct supplementary payments not linked with production, anticipating discussion on green box subsidies. Only more recently, though, has this shift become the core of the reform of the global agricultural system.

Historical context
By the 1980s, government payments to agricultural producers in industrialised countries had caused large crop surpluses, which were unloaded on the world market by means of export subsidies, pushing food prices down. The fiscal burden of protective measures increased, due both to lower receipts from import duties and higher domestic expenditure. In the meantime, the global economy had entered a cycle of recession, and the perception that opening up markets could improve economic conditions led to calls for a new round of multilateral trade negotiations. The round would open up markets in services and high-technology goods, ultimately generating much needed efficiency gains. In order to engage developing countries, many of which were "demandeurs" of new international disciplines, agriculture, textiles, and clothing were added to the grand bargain.

In leading up to the 1986 GATT Ministerial Conference in Punta del Este, Uruguay, farm lobbies in developed countries strongly resisted compromises on agriculture. In this context, the idea of exempting production and "trade-neutral" subsidies from WTO commitments was first proposed by the United States in 1987, and echoed soon after by the EU. By guaranteeing farmers continued support, it also neutralised opposition. In exchange for bringing agriculture within the disciplines of the WTO and committing to future reduction of trade-distorting subsidies, developed countries would be allowed to retain subsidies that cause "not more than minimal trade distortion" in order to deliver various public policy objectives.

Three pillars
The Agreement on Agriculture consists of three pillars — domestic support, market access, and export subsidies.

Domestic support
The first pillar of the Agreement on Agriculture is "domestic support". AoA divides domestic support into two categories: trade-distorting and non-trade-distorting (or minimally trade-distorting). The WTO Agreement on Agriculture negotiated in the Uruguay Round (1986–1994) includes the classification of subsidies by "boxes" depending on consequences of production and trade: amber (most directly linked to production levels), blue (production-limiting programmes that still distort trade), and green (minimal distortion). While payments in the amber box had to be reduced, those in the green box were exempt from reduction commitments. Detailed rules for green box payments are set out in Annex 2 of the AoA. However, all must comply with the "fundamental requirement" in paragraph 1, to cause not more than minimal distortion of trade or production, and must be provided through a government-funded programme that does not involve transfers from consumers or price support to producers.

The Agreement on Agriculture's domestic support system currently allows Europe and the United States to spend $380 billion a year on agricultural subsidies. The World Bank dismissed the EU and the United States' argument that small farmers needed protection, noting that more than half of the EU's Common Agricultural Policy subsidies go to 1% of producers while in the United States 70% of subsidies go to 10% of its producers, mainly agribusinesses. These subsidies end up flooding global markets with below-cost commodities, depressing prices, and undercutting producers in poor countries, a practice known as dumping.

Market access
Market access refers to the reduction of tariff (or non-tariff) barriers to trade by WTO members. The 1995 Agreement on Agriculture consists of tariff reductions of:
36% average reduction —  developed countries —  with a minimum of 15% per-tariff line reduction in next six years.
24% average reduction —  developing countries — with a minimum of 10% per-tariff line reduction in next ten years.
Least developed countries (LDCs) were exempt from tariff reductions, but they either had to convert non-tariff barriers to tariffs — a process called tariffication — or "bind" their tariffs, creating a ceiling that could not be increased in future.

Export subsidies
Export subsidies are the third pillar. The 1995 Agreement on Agriculture required developed countries to reduce export subsidies by at least 36% (by value) or by 21% (by volume) over six years. For developing countries, the agreement required cuts were 24% (by value) and 14% (by volume) over ten years.

Criticism
The Agreement has been criticised by civil society groups for reducing tariff protections for small farmers, a key source of income in developing countries, while simultaneously allowing rich countries to continue subsidizing agriculture at home.

The Agreement was criticised by NGOs for categorizing subsidies into trade-distorting domestic subsidies (the "amber box"), which have to be reduced, and non-trade-distorting subsidies (blue and green boxes), which escape discipline and thus can be increased. As efficient agricultural exporters press WTO members to reduce their trade-distorting "amber box" and "blue box" support, developed countries' green box spending has increased.

A 2009 book by the International Centre for Trade and Sustainable Development (ICTSD) showed how green box subsidies distorted trade, affecting developing country farmers and harming the environment. While some green box payments only had a minor effect on production and trade, others have a significant impact. According to countries' latest official reports to the WTO, the United States provided $76 billion (more than 90% of total spending) in green box payments in 2007, while the European Union notified €48 billion ($91 billion) in 2005, around half of all support. The EU's large and growing green box spending was decoupled from income support, which could lead to a significant impact on production and trade.

Third World Network stated, "This has allowed the rich countries to maintain or raise their very high subsidies by switching from one kind of subsidy to another...This is why after the Uruguay Round the total amount of subsidies in OECD countries have gone up instead of going down, despite the apparent promise that Northern subsidies will be reduced." Moreover, Martin Khor argued that the green and blue box subsidies can be just as trade-distorting — as "the protection is better disguised, but the effect is the same".<ref>TWN Statement on Agriculture at the UN ECOSOC High-Level Session"]  TWN, July 2003</ref>

At the 2005 WTO meeting in Hong Kong, countries agreed to eliminate export subsidy and equivalent payments by 2013. However, Oxfam argued that EU export subsidies comprise for only 3.5% of its overall agricultural support. United States, removed export subsidies for cotton which only covers 10% of overall spending.

on 18 July 2017 India and China jointly submitted a proposal to the World Trade Organization (WTO) calling for the elimination —  by developed countries — of the most trade-distorting form of farm subsidies, known in WTO parlance as Aggregate Measurement of Support (AMS) or 'Amber Box' support as a prerequisite   for consideration of other reforms in domestic support negotiations.

Mechanisms for developing countries
During the Doha negotiations, developing countries have fought to protect their interest and population, afraid of competing on the global market with strong developed and exporting economies. In many countries large populations living in rural areas, with limited access to infrastructure, farming resources and few employment alternatives. Thus, these countries are concerned that domestic rural populations employed in import-competing sectors might be negatively affected by further trade liberalization, becoming increasingly vulnerable to market instability and import surges as tariff barriers are removed. Several mechanisms have been suggested in order to preserve those countries: the Special Safeguard Mechanism (SSM) and treatment of Special Products (SPs).

Special Safeguard Mechanism
A Special Safeguard Mechanism (SSM) would allow developing countries to impose additional safety measures in the event of an abnormal surge in imports or the entry of unusually cheap imports. Debates have arisen around this question, some negotiating parties claiming that SSM could be repeatedly and excessively invoked, distorting trade. In turn, the G33 bloc of developing countries, a major SSM proponent, has argued that breaches of bound tariffs should not be ruled out if the SSM is to be an effective remedy. A 2010 study by the International Centre for Trade and Sustainable Development simulated the consequences of SSM on global trade for both developed and developing countries.

Special Products
At 2005 WTO Ministerial Conference in Hong Kong, WTO members agreed to allow developing countries to assign or make appropriate list of products for tariff lines as Special Products (SPs) based on "food security, livelihood security and rural development".

See also
 Agricultural policy of the United States
 Cairns Group
 Common Agricultural Policy
 Dumping (pricing policy)
 Peace Clause
 UN Sustainable Development Goals

References

External links
Text of the Agreement on Agriculture: html(1), html(2), doc, pdf
Institute for Agriculture and Trade Policy, Agreement on Agriculture Basics 2003.
Institute for Agriculture and Trade Policy, WTO Agreement on Agriculture: A Decade of Dumping, Feb 2005.
Devinder Sharma, The Indian Experience of Liberalisation of Agriculture, Aug 17, 2005.
Agricultural Subsidies in the WTO Green Box: Ensuring Coherence with Sustainable Development Goals , ICTSD, September 2009.
World Trade Organization and Agriculture: Selective Bibliography , prepared by Hugo H.R. van Hamel, Peace Palace Library
International Centre for Trade and Sustainable Development, Simulations on the Special Safeguard Mechanism: a look at the December 2008 Draft Agricultural Modalities , April 2010, by Raul Montemayor, Federation of Free Farmers Cooperatives, Inc. (FFFCI)
 Agritrade''[http://agritrade.cta.int/ website for ACP-EU agriculture and fisheries trade issues.
Agricultural Subsidies in the WTO Green Box: Ensuring Coherence with Sustainable Development Goals by Ricardo Meléndez-Ortiz, Christophe Bellmann, Jonathan Hepburn, September 2009.
WTO Negotiations on Agriculture and Developing Countries by Anwarul Hoda and Ashok Gulati, (2007) Johns Hopkins University Press

Agrarian politics
Agricultural economics
Agricultural treaties
Treaties concluded in 1994
Treaties entered into force in 1995
Treaties of Albania
Treaties of Angola
Treaties of Antigua and Barbuda
Treaties of Argentina
Treaties of Armenia
Treaties of Australia
Treaties of Austria
Treaties of Bahrain
Treaties of Bangladesh
Treaties of Barbados
Treaties of Belgium
Treaties of Belize
Treaties of Benin
Treaties of Bolivia
Treaties of Botswana
Treaties of Brazil
Treaties of Brunei
Treaties of Bulgaria
Treaties of Burkina Faso
Treaties of Burundi
Treaties of Cambodia
Treaties of Cameroon
Treaties of Canada
Treaties of Cape Verde
Treaties of the Central African Republic
Treaties of Chad
Treaties of Chile
Treaties of the People's Republic of China
Treaties of Taiwan
Treaties of Colombia
Treaties of the Republic of the Congo
Treaties of Costa Rica
Treaties of Ivory Coast
Treaties of Croatia
Treaties of Cuba
Treaties of Cyprus
Treaties of the Czech Republic
Treaties of the Democratic Republic of the Congo
Treaties of Denmark
Treaties of Djibouti
Treaties of Dominica
Treaties of the Dominican Republic
Treaties of Ecuador
Treaties of Egypt
Treaties of El Salvador
Treaties of Estonia
Treaties entered into by the European Union
Treaties of Fiji
Treaties of Finland
Treaties of France
Treaties of Gabon
Treaties of the Gambia
Treaties of Georgia (country)
Treaties of Germany
Treaties of Ghana
Treaties of Greece
Treaties of Grenada
Treaties of Guatemala
Treaties of Guinea
Treaties of Guinea-Bissau
Treaties of Guyana
Treaties of Haiti
Treaties of Honduras
Treaties of Hong Kong
Treaties of Hungary
Treaties of Iceland
Treaties of India
Treaties of Indonesia
Treaties of Ireland
Treaties of Israel
Treaties of Italy
Treaties of Jamaica
Treaties of Japan
Treaties of Jordan
Treaties of Kazakhstan
Treaties of Kenya
Treaties of Kuwait
Treaties of Kyrgyzstan
Treaties of Laos
Treaties of Latvia
Treaties of Lesotho
Treaties of Liberia
Treaties of Liechtenstein
Treaties of Lithuania
Treaties of Luxembourg
Treaties of Macau
Treaties of Madagascar
Treaties of Malawi
Treaties of Malaysia
Treaties of the Maldives
Treaties of Mali
Treaties of Malta
Treaties of Mauritania
Treaties of Mauritius
Treaties of Mexico
Treaties of Mongolia
Treaties of Montenegro
Treaties of Morocco
Treaties of Mozambique
Treaties of Myanmar
Treaties of Namibia
Treaties of Nepal
Treaties of the Netherlands
Treaties of New Zealand
Treaties of Nicaragua
Treaties of Niger
Treaties of Nigeria
Treaties of Norway
Treaties of Oman
Treaties of Pakistan
Treaties of Panama
Treaties of Papua New Guinea
Treaties of Paraguay
Treaties of Peru
Treaties of the Philippines
Treaties of Poland
Treaties of Portugal
Treaties of Qatar
Treaties of South Korea
Treaties of Moldova
Treaties of Romania
Treaties of Russia
Treaties of Rwanda
Treaties of Samoa
Treaties of Saudi Arabia
Treaties of Senegal
Treaties of Seychelles
Treaties of Sierra Leone
Treaties of Singapore
Treaties of Slovakia
Treaties of Slovenia
Treaties of the Solomon Islands
Treaties of South Africa
Treaties of Spain
Treaties of Sri Lanka
Treaties of Saint Kitts and Nevis
Treaties of Saint Lucia
Treaties of Saint Vincent and the Grenadines
Treaties of Suriname
Treaties of Eswatini
Treaties of Sweden
Treaties of Switzerland
Treaties of Tajikistan
Treaties of Thailand
Treaties of North Macedonia
Treaties of Togo
Treaties of Tonga
Treaties of Trinidad and Tobago
Treaties of Tunisia
Treaties of Turkey
Treaties of Uganda
Treaties of Ukraine
Treaties of the United Arab Emirates
Treaties of the United Kingdom
Treaties of Tanzania
Treaties of the United States
Treaties of Uruguay
Treaties of Vanuatu
Treaties of Venezuela
Treaties of Vietnam
Treaties of Yemen
Treaties of Zambia
Treaties of Zimbabwe
World Trade Organization agreements